is a Japanese manga series illustrated and written by Koge Donbo. The manga started serialization in the Japanese shōnen manga magazine Comic Blade on July 30, 2008, published by Mag Garden. It is ongoing, with seven volumes as of May 10, 2011.
English-language distribution was being handled by Tokyopop; however, they were only able to publish the first volume before closing in May 2011 due to bankruptcy.

Plot

Takenomaru Sagami is a violinist prodigy with a contract to fulfill. When he was 11 years old, Takenomaru contracted smallpox and became critically ill. Constantly feeling unwanted and hated throughout his life, he looked towards death as an escape. In his weak condition, he discovered hope in life from world-famous violinist and soldier Lieutenant Sagami, who encouraged him to learn the violin once he recovered from his illness. He told him music had nothing to do with race, which Takenomaru was used to seeing criticism for because of his foreign blood. Not long after finding his hope and purpose, Takenomaru stood before the entrance of death and made a contract with "an angel" in order to continue living. In exchange for being allowed to live and two other certain gifts he must sacrifice others by collecting the twelve Tears of Maria. Out of his resentment for the world, he agrees readily. Seven years later, at the music school where his foster father (Sagami) teaches, he pursues twelve girls to attain the jewels that represent each girl's feelings for him. He gives them each a brooch that changes color by the intensity feelings they have for him. Once they fall in love with him, the girls must face their death in order for Takenomaru to collect the Tear of Maria hidden in the girls’ hearts.

Characters

Takenomaru Sagami: Eighteen years old, and adopted by Mr. Sagami. He's also a master of the violin (a "prodigy") and is quite good looking. When he was younger he was bullied and mistreated because of his "white man's blood" by the town's children and adults, even by the old man who took him in after his father and then mother abandoned him. When he was at the verge of dying he made a pact with an "angel" and gained his lifeforce back, as well as two gifts, those of musical talent and good looks (the latter ridding him of potential pockmarks from his deadly case of smallpox); but as part of the contract he must attain the twelve Tears of Maria.He resembles Kazune and Suzune Kujyou from Kamichama Karin.

Mr. Sagami: Adoptive father of Takenomaru, he is skeptical of his activities. His relationship with Takenomaru is complicated. He lost his left hand in the war, and his wife also died, so he holds high expectation of "Take" (as he calls Takenomaru) to become a great violinist and make him proud.

Nakae Wakabayashi: Childhood friend of Takenomaru who protected him and was his only companion. She came from their hometown to live and work in the city. She ends up working at Takenomaru's and Mr. Sagami's house as a maid. Even after seven years, when they reconnect, Nakae still calls Takenomaru by the childish nickname "Take-chan" and acts as if she was his older sister.  Her overprotectiveness of Takenomaru is similar to Pita Ten's Koboshi Uematsu's towards protagonist Kotarou Higuchi.

Nanao Kaga: A naive girl who, against her father's wishes and future arranged marriage, joins the music school in pursuit of Takenomaru, whom she once heard playing the violin and ended up moved by his performance. In the beginning, she calls him "Takenomaru-sama," but changes it to "Takenomaru-san" after she finds out he is younger than her (putting her anywhere between 19 and 21 years of age). She is the first to fall in love with him and is then stabbed by Takenomaru in a church building so that he may gather the first Tear of Maria from her. She resembles Karin Hanazono/Suzuka Kujyo from Kamichama Karin.

Misaki Kanda: A young girl who resembles Misha from Koge Donbo's previous work Pita Ten. She became friends with Nanao after they met and thinks of her even after her death, although she and a few others assume it is either a "disappearance" or a transference.

Rumoi Matsumae: A young girl who is blind in one eye and extremely smart, considered a genius. Because of her intelligence, she is allowed to be at the school as an exception for someone of her young age.  She carries a pink bunny doll.

Chigusa Nakamura: A quiet, mysterious and mature student who likes archery. She seems to know something about what is going on with Takenomaru and the Tears of Maria.

Hikari Hagi: This spunky girl holds great admiration for Takenomaru. In volume 3, she and Takenomaru go on a date which eventually leads to them sleeping together. Then, the day after they get in a fight and Hikari commits suicide. She looks similar to Rabi~En~Rose from Di Gi Charat.

Mine Shimabara: Twin sister of Miwa and her polar opposite, she dislikes the idea of having a male student in the all-girls music school. She becomes Takenomaru's 2nd Maria and victim, suffering the same fate as Nanao.

Miwa Shimabara: A nun who is gentle, quiet and sweet.

Kami Muroto: A girl with twin tails who wields a sword. She attacks Takenomaru for no apparent reason and gravely injures him.

Maiko C. Suma: She is Takenomaru's younger sister, whom he hasn't seen in a long time.  They have the same hair color, but her eyes are green while his are red. Later in the chapters, she also receives a brooch from Takenomaru. The "C" stands for "Catherine."

Asahi Nanba: A beautiful looking girl wearing a white kimono. Her expression appears emotionless, revealing that she is not human but rather a singing doll. Later in the chapters she also receives a brooch.

Ukyo Sagano: Is a young girl with black hair and red eyes who wears a miko attire, she seems to be cheerful and naive. She looks like Himeka Kujyo and Himeka/Rika Karasuma from Kamichama Karin.

The Angel: He/She has not make a corporeal appearance yet. He/She was the one who made a pact with Takenomaru and granted him the two gifts in exchange for the twelve Tears of Maria.

Reception 
Snow Wildsmith, writing for ICv2, a pop culture trade news site, gave the first volume 1 out of 5 stars. Her chief complaint was the jarring discrepancy between the dark story and the cute style of both the art and dialogue.

References

External links 
 Comic Blade's Naki Shōjo no Tame no Pavane website 
 

2008 manga
Fantasy anime and manga
Mag Garden manga
Shōnen manga